St. James' Orthodox Church at Mayur Vihar Phase-3 in Delhi, India is the first parish dedicated to St. James the Elder, in the Malankara Orthodox Syrian Church. It was established in the year 2001.

Institution
St. James' Play School, Mayur Vihar Phase-3, Delhi

References

External links
 Official website of St. James' Orthodox Church
 Official website of Malankara Orthodox Syrian Church

Churches in Delhi
Christianity in Delhi
Malankara Orthodox Syrian Church dioceses